This article contains a list of bands formed in New York City, New York.  Bands should be notable and linked to their articles which lists their New York origins in the lead.  References should be provided for any new entries on this list.  Bands may be temporarily red-linked (while an article is developed) as long as the reference establishes that the band is notable and from New York.

#
 108
 24-7 Spyz
 2 in a Room

A–F

 A Place To Bury Strangers
 A Tribe Called Quest
 Agnostic Front
 Alice Donut
 AJR
 American Classical Orchestra
 American Composers Orchestra
 The Amygdaloids
 The Antlers
 Anthrax
 Bad Ronald
 Band of Susans
 Barkmarket
 Battles
 Bayside
 Beach Fossils
 Beastie Boys
 Blondie
 Blood, Sweat & Tears
 Bloodsimple
 Bloody Panda
 The Blue Flames
 Blue Öyster Cult
 Blues Magoos
 The Books
 Boys Choir of Harlem
 Brand New
 The Brandos
 Breakfast Club
 Breaking Laces
 Brutal Truth
 Burn
 The Cake
 Cameo
 The Candles
 Castevet
 Certain General
 Chic
 The Chiffons
 Cibo Matto
 Circus Mort
 The City and Horses
 Class Actress
 The Coachmen
 Coheed and Cambria
 The Cold Crush Brothers
 Company Flow
 Contre
 The Cookies
 The Cramps
 The Cro-Mags
 The Crystals
 The Davenports
 Deee-Lite
 Defunkt
 De La Soul
 DeLeon
 The Devil Dogs
 The Dictators
 DIIV
 The Diplomats
 Dirty Projectors
 DJ Logic
 Dope
 Drowners
 The Druids of Stonehenge
 The Drums
 Elephant's Memory
 Envy On The Coast
 Errortype: Eleven
 Even Worse
 Fischerspooner
 Foreigner
 Fountains of Wayne
 Four to the Bar
 Freelance Whales
 Full Blown Chaos
 Fun
 Fun Lovin' Criminals

G–M

 Gato Loco
 The Ghost of a Saber Tooth Tiger
 Glassjaw
 The Golden Filter
 Goodbye Picasso
 Gorilla Biscuits
 Grizzly Bear
 Groove Theory
 The Groupies
 Growing
 Grupo Latin Vibe
 Gumball
 G-Unit
 The Heartbreakers
 Richard Hell and the Voidoids
 Helmet
 Hem
 Hercules and Love Affair
 Holy Ghost!
 The Hundred in the Hands
 Interpol
 The Indecent
 Ism
 Javelin
 Jawbreaker
 Jets to Brazil
 Kid Creole and the Coconuts
 Kinetics & One Love
 Kiss
 LCD Soundsystem
 Leftöver Crack
 The Little Orchestra Society
 Life Of Agony
 Living Colour
 Lord Tariq and Peter Gunz
 Lotion
 The Lounge Lizards
 The Lovin' Spoonful
 The Mamas & the Papas
 Method Man & Redman
 Michael Hill's Blues Mob
 Midtown
 Miller Miller Miller & Sloan
 Mindless Self Indulgence
 MisterWives
 MNDR
 Mod Fun
 The Mooney Suzuki
 Murphy's Law

N–S

 Nada Surf
 Naturally 7
 NBC Symphony Orchestra
 Neon Boys
 New York Bandura Ensemble
 New York Dolls
 New York Percussion Trio
 New York Philharmonic
 Ninja Sex Party
 Nuclear Assault
 One For All
 Orpheus Chamber Orchestra
 The Pains of Being Pure at Heart
 Paperdoll
 Park Avenue Chamber Symphony
 Parts & Labor
 Pretendo
 The Pretty Reckless
 Prong
 PS22 chorus
 Public Enemy
 Quicksand
 The Raelettes
 Ramones
 The Rapture
 Ratatat
 Riot
 The Ronettes
 The Ropes
 Run-DMC
 School of Seven Bells
 Scissor Sisters
 Seguida
 The Shangri-Las
 Sheer Terror
 Shelter
 The Shondes
 Shootyz Groove
 Shy Child
 Sick of It All
 Silos
 Simon & Garfunkel
 Skaters
 Sleigh Bells
 Sonic Youth
 Spacehog
 Spin Doctors
 Spread Eagle
 Steely Dan
 The Steinettes
 The Strangeloves
 The Strokes
 ST-X Ensemble
 Suffocation
 Swans
 Sylar (band)

T–Z

 Taking Back Sunday
 Talking Heads
 Teenage Jesus and the Jerks
 Television
 Terror Squad
 Texas Is the Reason
 They Might Be Giants
 Tiny Masters of Today
 Toilet Böys
 Tomandandy
 Trachtenburg Family Slideshow Players
 Trilogy
 TV On The Radio
 Type O Negative
 Ui
 The Unlovables
 Unsane
 Vampire Weekend
 The Van Pelt
 The Velvet Underground
 Richard Hell and the Voidoids
 Versus
 The Waldorf-Astoria Orchestra
 Warzone
 Weep
 White Zombie
 Wungabongas
 Wu-Tang Clan
 X27
 Yeah Yeah Yeahs

See also

 Lists of musicians
 List of people from New York City

References

New York City

Bands